The 2nd Golden Bell Awards was held on 26 March 1966 at the Zhongshan Hall in Taipei, Taiwan. The ceremony was hosted by James Shen.

Winners

References

1966
1966 in Taiwan